This list of mountain huts in the Alps includes huts, shelters and similar simple accommodations. In addition to a large number of Alpine club huts of the Alpine clubs, there are also many in private ownership. The list includes some, but by far not all huts in the seven Alpine countries of Germany, France, Italy, Liechtenstein, Austria, Switzerland and Slovenia.

List of mountain huts in the alps 

Mountain huts, Alps